Olaf Kardolus (born 27 March 1963) is a Dutch fencer. He competed in the team épée event at the 1988 Summer Olympics.

References

External links
 

1963 births
Living people
Dutch male fencers
Olympic fencers of the Netherlands
Fencers at the 1988 Summer Olympics
Sportspeople from The Hague
20th-century Dutch people